Winslow W. Terrill (1870 – November 5, 1897), also known as "Windsor", was an American Negro league infielder in the 1880s and 1890s.

A native of Boston, Massachusetts, Terrill began his professional career with the Boston Resolutes in 1887. In 1890, he played for the York Colored Monarchs, and the following season for the Cuban Giants and New York Gorhams. He finished his career with a two-year stint with the Cuban X-Giants in 1896 and 1897. Terrill died in Cambridge, Massachusetts in 1897 at age 26 or 27.

References

External links
  and Seamheads

1870 births
Date of birth missing
1897 deaths
Cuban Giants players
Cuban X-Giants players
New York Gorhams players
Baseball players from Boston
Baseball infielders